Cheniguel is a town and commune in Médéa Province, Algeria. According to the 1998 census it had a population of 5,734. 10 years later it had a population of 6,866.

References

Communes of Médéa Province